Jamalpur is a city in the Indian state of Bihar. It is situated 8 km from the Munger city centre. Jamalpur is a part of Munger-Jamalpur twin cities.It is main railhead for reaching Munger city.

The name Jamalpur means Jamal (beautiful) pur (town). Jamalpur is best known for the Jamalpur Locomotive Workshop, which employs more than 25,000 people at its training institution, The Indian Railways Institute of Mechanical and Electrical Engineering. Annual turnover is Rs. 10.56 billion with 111,485 employees. This is Asia's largest and oldest locomotive railway workshop. The city was established in 1862 during the British Raj, with the Railways Institute forming its cultural hub.

Etymology

Jamalpur is named after 16th century Sufi saint Jamal Baba, whose dargah (shrine) is still present at East Colony Hospital Road, Jamalpur.

History

The city was established in 1862 during the British Raj, with the Railways Institute forming its cultural hub.

The paleolithic site of "Kali Pahar," atop Jamalpur Hill, was the location of an important find of Early and Middle Stone Age quartzite implements.

Geography

The suburb is a part of the Munger city. The city centre of Munger is 8 kilometres (5.0 mi) northwest of the Jamalpur area of Munger city. There is a road as well as a rail link, Munger Ganga Bridge, which was completed recently. Jamalpur is an overnight rail or road journey from Kolkata.

The nearest airport is Munger Airport near the Safiyabad area of Munger city. The nearest international airport is Netaji Subhas Chandra Bose International Airport in Kolkata,  from Jamalpur on NH 33.

Demographics
, Jamalpur had a population of 399,697, with a ratio of 880 females for every 1,000 males. The average literacy rate is 87.38%; for men it is 92.58%, and for women it is 81.40%. There are 15,543 children in Jamalpur aged 0 to 6, with a ratio of 876 girls for every 1,000 boys.

Industry and culture

Locomotive workshop
The Jamalpur site was chosen for its proximity both to the Sahibganj loop, which was the main trunk route at the time and to the communities of gunsmiths and other mechanical craftsmen in Bihar.

The workshop was initially for repairing locomotives and assembling new ones from salvaged parts. By the early 20th century, however, it had progressed to producing its own locomotives. It produced the first one, CA 764 "Lady Curzon", in 1899. In 1893, it became the site of the first railway foundry in India. It also had a workshop for repairing and building boilers. Today it has foundry, metallurgical lab facilities, and machine tool facilities. Its rolling mill and nut and bolt shop ceased operation in 1984.

The school attached to the workshop eventually became the Indian Railways Institute of Mechanical and Electrical Engineering (IRIMEE).

Ananda Marga 
The Ananda Marga movement was founded in Jamalpur by native Prabhat Ranjan Sarkar in 1955.

Places of interest 

JSA Stadium, a football stadium
The Jamalpur Gymkhana, the hostel and club used by the Special Class Railway Apprentices
The Jamalpur Golf Course, the site of the annual ITC Golf Tournament
Kali Pahadi, a mountain and picnic spot featuring a temple to the Hindu goddess Kali
Panchmukhi hanuman mandir, badidariyapur jamalpur
Jogi asthan durga mandir, rampur basti jamalpur
Tunnel {jamalpur- bhagalpur train route} near nayagaon, jamalpur
Baptist Church, albert road, nayagaon, jamalpur
St. Joseph Catholic church, east colony, jamalpur
St. Mary's church, golf road, jamalpur
Gandhi library, Daulatpur, munger road
Yog maya badi durga devi mandir, Shani Dev Mandir, Sadar Bazar, Jamalpur
Historical Jamalpur workshop
Jamalpur filter water works at the top of kali pahadi

Education

Colleges 
 J. R. S. College
 Jamalpur College
 Indian Railway Institute of Mechanical and Electrical Engineering
 Bihar Institute of Management & technology
 Eastern railway inter College, Jamalpur
 Manju Srijan Private ITI
 Techno India NJR Institute of technology

Schools
 Eastern Railway Mixed Primary School: used to be called "European & Anglo Indian Day School" established more than a century before in 1915
 Notre Dame Academy, Jamalpur: The first Notre Dame school in India, founded in 1950. Notre Dame Academy is a Catholic Institution managed by the Patna Notre Dame Sisters' Society. 
 D.A.V. Public School, Jamalpur is located in Nayatola Keshopur Jamalpur. One of the Top School in Bihar State. This is to +2 Level. It is Arya Samaj society and managing committee of DAV CMC New Delhi. Affiliated to CBSE board.
 Eastern Railway Inter College: A high school for railway employees' children, and one of the oldest high schools in the city.
 Kendriya Vidyalaya, Jamalpur: a CBSE-affiliated Kendriya Vidyalaya set up in 1973 with the sponsorship of the Eastern Railway.
 Parvati Devi High School, Daulatpur, Jamalpur
 St Michael  school jamalpur
 Holy family English medium School, Jamalpur, Munger
 St. Roberts School, Jamalpur
 St. Michael High School, Jamalpur
 Collins International School, Jamalpur
 Primary School Jagdishpur, Jamalpur
 Path Bhawan, Jamalpur
 Saraswati Vidya Mandir, Jamalpur
 NC Ghosh Girl's high School, Jamalpur
 St. Columbus high School, Jamalpur
 Shri Shastri High School, Jamalpur
 St. Mary School, Jamalpur
 Railway Pilot School, Jamalpur
 ATP School, Jamalpur
 Vidya Jyoti Public School, Jamalpur
 Daulatpur School, Jamalpur
 Rampur Primary School, Jamalpur
 Arya Samaj Girls School, Jamalpur
 Central School, Jamalpur
 Potential Kids primary School, Jamalpur
 Achchu Ram School, Jamalpur
 National Glory Academy, Jamalpur
 Saraswati Shishu Mandir, Jamalpur
 Sai Academy, Jamalpur 
 St. Xavier School, Jamalpur
 little Genius Kids School, Jamalpur
 Nirmala Residential School, Jamalpur
 Goodluck Kid's Play School, Jamalpur

See also
Jamalpur, Munger (Vidhan Sabha constituency)
Jamalpur Gymkhana
Jamalpur Locomotive Workshop
Jamalpur railway station
List of cities in Bihar by population

References

External links 
 History of Jamalpur Locomotive Works
 Jamalpur Municipality
 Blog on Jamalpur

Cities and towns in Munger district